Siegfried I the Elder (Siegfried der Ältere von Walbeck) (died 15 March 990), Count of Walbeck and Möckerngau, son of Lothar II the Old, Count of Walbeck, and Mathilde von Arneburg.

Rule 
He succeeded his father as Count of Walbeck upon his death. Siegfried is first mentioned as an ally of Odo I, Margrave of the Saxon Ostmark, in his conflict with Mieszko I, Duke of Poland.  In particular, Siegfried fought in the Battle of Cedynia (Zehden), as reported in the Chronicon of Siegfried’s son Thietmar of Merseburg.  Both Siegfried and Odo escaped the ensuing slaughter. As an interesting sidebar, Mieszko married Oda of Haldensleben, daughter of Dietrich, Margrave of the Nordmark, who was the predecessor of Siegfried’s brother Lothar I as margrave. In 979, he and his brothers were appointed regents of the County of Möckerngau by Emperor Otto II.  Siegfried consolidated his position as sole count in 983.  Later that year, he fought with the Saxon army against the Great Slav Rising revolt against the empire.

Death 
He supported the Empress Theophanu in her war against Boleslaus II in 990, and while moving against the rebellious Lutici, he fell from his horse and died on 15 March 990.

Marriage and Children 
Siegfried married Kunigunde von Stade daughter of Henry I the Bald, Count of Stade. Siegfried and Kunigunde had five sons:
 Henry, Count of Walbeck (killed in battle, 1004)
 Friedrick, Count of Walbeck
 Thietmar of Merseburg, Bishop of Merseburg
 Siegfried of Walbeck, Bishop of Münster, 1022-1032
 Bruno of Walbeck, Bishop of Verden, 1034-1049.

Upon his death, Siegfried was succeeded as Count of Walbeck by his son Henry.

References

Sources 
Warner, David A., Ottonian Germany: The Chronicon of Thietmar of Merseburg, Manchester University Press, Manchester, 2001
Grosse, Walther, Die Grafen von Walbeck. In: Harz-Zeitschrift, 1952
Medieval Lands Project, Grafen von Walbeck

Counts of Germany
10th-century births
990 deaths
Year of birth unknown